The Young and the Restless is an American television soap opera. It was first broadcast on March 26, 1973, and airs on CBS. The following is a list of characters that first appeared on the soap opera in 2015, by order of first appearance. All characters are introduced by executive producer Jill Farren Phelps and co-executive producer/head writer Charles Pratt, Jr.

Marco Annicelli

Marco Annicelli was a primary antagonist in Victor Newman's plan to bring down his rival, Jack Abbott. He was portrayed by Peter Bergman, who portrayed Jack at the same time.

Marco's character was introduced in a plot in which Jack Abbott's character would be forcibly swapped out. He acted as a doppelgänger, and took over his life, while Real Jack was held captive in an unknown location.

Winston Mobley

Marisa Sierras

Emma Randall

Emma Randall, portrayed by Alice Greczyn, was introduced in September 2015 as the sister of Gwen Randall. Greczyn's casting was announced on August 7, 2015, through Soaps In Depth. The role would be recurring. Greczyn’s role was diminished, when the soap faced budgetary cuts.

Luca Santori

Luca Santori, portrayed by Miles Gaston Villanueva, is introduced as the estranged husband of Marisa Sierras (Sofia Pernas). The series had released a casting call for role in July 2015. Villanueva's casting was announced on August 10, 2015. The actor had previously appeared on the series in a bit part of a priest assisting Nikki Newman (Melody Thomas Scott) with locating her long lost son, Dylan McAvoy (Steve Burton).

In 2015, Villanueva was cast in the newly created role of Luca Santori and is revealed to be the estranged husband of Marisa Sierras (Sofia Pernas), the girlfriend of Noah Newman (Robert Adamson). Luca would later grant Marisa a divorce so that she could pursue a serious romantic relationship with Noah. Luca was also briefly engaged to Nicholas Newman (Joshua Morrow) and Phyllis Abbott's (Gina Tognoni) daughter Summer Newman (Hunter King), before the engagement was called off when it was revealed by Victoria Newman's (Amelia Heinle) boyfriend, Travis Crawford (Michael Roark), at Luca and Summer's engagement party that Luca was responsible for the destruction of the oil rigs owned by Newman Enterprises and he was arrested for that crime and sent to prison.

Christian Newman

Christian Newman is a fictional character from the original CBS Daytime soap opera, The Young and the Restless. He is the son of Sage Warner (Kelly Sullivan) and Adam Newman (Justin Hartley), prematurely delivered by Adam in Chancellor Park on October 7, 2015. Christian was presumed dead on November 8, 2015, as a result of complications from his premature birth. It was previously believed that Nicholas Newman (Joshua Morrow) is his father, however, it was revealed that Adam is Christian's biological father, and Adam doctored the results to avoid suspicion when he was masquerading as the late Gabriel Bingham. Only days later, it was revealed that Christian's death was faked by Dr. Anderson (Elizabeth Bogush), a doctor at Fairview. Dr. Anderson's motives for stealing the baby and faking his death are still unknown at this time, but on November 23, 2015, she handed Christian to Sharon Newman (Sharon Case) and congratulated her on the birth of her new son. Sharon was a patient at Fairview who was severely medicated by Dr. Anderson and kept in a drug-induced state. The doctor convinced Sharon that she was pregnant (she has miscarried) and kept her isolated at the hospital. Sharon and her husband, Dylan McAvoy (Steve Burton) decided to name "their" baby Sullivan "Sully" McAvoy, in honor of Dylan's friend who was killed in Afghanistan.

Sage confronted Nurse Stephens on April 27, 2016, and she admitted to stealing Christian and helping Dr. Anderson pass off Christian as Sharon's son. Sharon had a DNA test run which proved "Sully" was really Christian but decided to hide the truth. Sage confronted Sharon, who admitted the truth, but Sage died in a car wreck on her way to tell Nick that Christian was alive. The secret was exposed a few months later and Nick and Christian were reunited. In 2019, after Christian's biological father Adam returns, he was seeking to reunite with Christian, but was rebuffed by Nick and sued  for custody of Christian.

Simon Neville

Simone Neville, portrayed by Daytime Emmy winning actor Michael E. Knight, was introduced as a doctor for hire working on behalf of Neil Winters (Kristoff St. John) in October 2015. Best known for his portrayal of Tad Martin on All My Children, Knight's casting was announced by TV Insider in September 2015. In June 2016, it was announced that Knight had finished taping for the role.

Elise Moxley

Elise Moxley, portrayed by Jensen Buchanan, was introduced in November 2015.

References

External links
Character and cast at the Internet Movie Database 
Characters and cast at TV Guide

, 2015
The Young and the Restless